Croatia competed at the 2014 Winter Olympics in Sochi, Russia, from 7 to 23 February 2014. Croatia qualified 11 athletes, the fewest athletes in the fewest sports since the 1998 Winter Olympics.

Competitors

Medalists

Alpine skiing 

According to the quota allocation released on 20 January 2014, Croatia had eight athletes in qualification position. One of the women's quotas was exchanged for the sixth quota in men's alpine skiing. The team was announced on 27 January.

Men

Women

Cross-country skiing 

According to the quota allocation released on 20 January 2014, Croatia had two athletes in qualification position. For the first time since 2006 Croatia qualified athletes with A standards, meaning that they will be able to compete in more than one event. Vedrana Malec was the only female Croatian skier that reached A standard while the men's quota was decided between Edi Dadić and Andrej Burić. The team was announced on 24 January.

Distance

Sprint

Snowboarding 

Croatia received a reallocation quota spot in women's halfpipe. This was the first time that Croatia will be represented in a snowboarding event at the Olympics. The sole representative was announced on 24 January.

Halfpipe

Sports without participation by Croatia

Biathlon 

Despite winning a bronze medal in biathlon at the 2010 Winter Olympics, Croatia was the eight reserve in men's biathlon. For the first time since the 1998 Winter Olympics, Croatia did not compete in biathlon. Jakov Fak, the 2010 bronze medalist, competed for Slovenia this year instead of Croatia.

Bobsleigh 

Croatia was the third reserve in four-man bobsleigh event. This was the first time since the 1998 Winter Olympics that Croatia did not qualify for the Olympics in a bobsleigh event.

Figure skating 

Josip Gluhak competed at the 2013 Nebelhorn Trophy, but failed to qualify for the Olympics. Croatia has not competed in a figure skating event since 2006.

Luge 

Croatia's Daria Obratov was the first reserve in women's luge. Croatia has never competed in an Olympic luge event.

References

External links 
 
 

Nations at the 2014 Winter Olympics
2014
Winter Olympics